Clarence Lee Moore (January 3, 1908 – November 17, 1992), nicknamed "Cool Breeze", was an American Negro league first baseman in the 1920s.

A native of Eldorado, Arkansas, Moore attended Shaw University and North Carolina A & T State University, and played for the Bacharach Giants in 1928. He died in Asheville, North Carolina in 1992 at age 84.

References

External links
 and Seamheads
 Clarence Moore at Arkansas Baseball Encyclopedia

1908 births
1992 deaths
Bacharach Giants players
Baseball first basemen
Baseball players from Arkansas
People from El Dorado, Arkansas
20th-century African-American sportspeople